The canton of Vitry-le-François-Champagne et Der is an administrative division of the Marne department, northeastern France. It was created at the French canton reorganisation which came into effect in March 2015. Its seat is in Vitry-le-François.

It consists of the following communes:
 
Ablancourt
Arzillières-Neuville
Aulnay-l'Aître
Bignicourt-sur-Marne
Blacy
Blaise-sous-Arzillières
Bréban
Chapelaine
Châtelraould-Saint-Louvent
La Chaussée-sur-Marne
Coole
Corbeil
Courdemanges
Couvrot
Drouilly
Frignicourt
Glannes
Huiron
Humbauville
Lignon
Loisy-sur-Marne
Maisons-en-Champagne
Margerie-Hancourt
Marolles
Le Meix-Tiercelin
Pringy
Les Rivières-Henruel
Saint-Chéron
Saint-Ouen-Domprot
Saint-Utin
Sompuis
Somsois
Songy
Soulanges
Vitry-le-François

References

Cantons of Marne (department)